This is a list of notable members of the Air Training Corps or Combined Cadet Force (RAF Section).

 Danny Blanchflower
 Richard Burton
 Geoff Capes
 Linford Christie
 John Conteh
 Timothy Dalton
 Len Deighton
 Tom Fletcher
 Michael Foale
 Neil Fox (broadcaster)
 Robson Green
 Raimund Herincx
 James Hickman
 Brian Jones
 Thomas Kerr (engineer)
 Warren Mitchell
 Patrick Moore
 Michael Nicholson
 Gary Numan
 Paul Nurse
 Nicholas Patrick
 Bill Pertwee
 Brian Rix
 Ralph Robins
 Chris Ryan
 Jimmy Savile
 Piers Sellers
 John Sherwood (athlete)
 Alan Sillitoe
 Laura Trevelyan
 Rory Underwood
 Alan Ward
 Will Whitehorn
 Andrew Wilson
 Bill Wyman

References

 Air Cadets Famous Cadets Page 
 121 Squadron's Adult Volunteer Booklet

Air Training Corps
cadets